This is a list of people born in, residents of, or otherwise closely associated with the city of Nantes, France.

A 
 Anne of Brittany (1477–1514), Duchess of Brittany and Queen consort of France (only woman to have married two kings of France, Charles VIII and Louis XII)

B 
 Jean Marguerite Bachelier (1751-1843), revolutionary 
 Charles-Amable Battaille (1822–1872), French operatic bass
 Henri-Franck Beaupérin (born 1968), classical organist
 François Bégaudeau (born 1971), writer, journalist and actor
 René Berthelot (? – 1664), French actor and prominent member of Molière's theatre troupe
Sophie Berthelot (1837–1907), wife of Marcellin Berthelot and the first woman to be interred at the Panthéon
 Louis-Albert Bourgault-Ducoudray (1840–1910), composer and professor (Prix de Rome laureate)
 Claire Bretécher (1940–2020), cartoonist
 Aristide Briand (1862–1932), French statesman (1926 Nobel Peace Prize laureate)

C 
 Claude Cahun (born Lucy Schwob) (1894–1954), photographer and author
 Pierre Cambronne, general (commander of the Old Guard at Waterloo)
 Jacques Cassard (1679–1740), corsair
 Jeanne Cherhal, singer-songwriter
 Athanase-Charles-Marie Charette de la Contrie (1832–1911), French royal and general
 C2C, music producer

D 
 Jacques Demy, movie director
 Jehan Desanges, (1929–2021), historian

F 
 Manu Feildel, French chef/culinary contest judge, now lives in Australia, judge of My Kitchen Rules.
 Thierry Fortineau (1953–2006), actor
 Ernest Fouinet (1799–1845), 19th-century novelist and poet.

G 
 Jean Graton (1923–2021), cartoonist, creator of Michel Vaillant
 Brigitte Grésy (born 1947), French minister

H 
 Linda Hardy (born 1973), actress and model (Miss France 1992)

L 
 Paul Ladmirault (1844–1944), composer
 Paul de la Gironière (1797–1862), traveller
 Julien de Lallande Poydras (1740–1824), New Orleans member of the United States House of Representatives, merchant, planter, financier, poet and educator
 Denys de La Patellière (1921–2013), film director and scriptwriter
 Charles-Auguste Lebourg (1829–1906), sculptor
 Hugo Leclercq, aka Madeon (born 1994), music producer and electronic music artist
 Pierre Le Faguays (1892–1962), sculptor
 Jean Leray (1906–1998), mathematician
 Héloïse Letissier (born 1988), (aka Christine and the Queen) singer

M 
 Joseph Malègue (1876-1940), novelist
 Suzanne Malherbe (aka Marcel Moore), illustrator and designer
 Hugo Marchand, ballet dancer
 Pierre Mauget, professional footballer
 Amédée Ménard, sculptor
 Anne-Gabriel Meusnier de Querlon (1702–1780), man of letters
 Anna Mouglalis, actress

P 
 Yvonne Pouzin (1884–1947), phthisiatrist, wife of Joseph Malègue

R 
 Jules Edouard Roiné, sculptor and medallist
 Benoit Regent (1953–1994), actor

S 
 Constance de Salm (1767–1845), poet and miscellaneous writer; through her second marriage, she became Princess of Salm-Dyck
 Alice Sauvrezis (1866–1946), composer, pianist, and choral conductor

T 
 Éric Tabarly (1931–1998), sailor
 Sylvie Tellier (born 1978), model (Miss France 2002)
 Roger Tessier (born 1939), composer
 Jérémy Toulalan (born 1983), football player
 Auguste Toulmouche (1829-1890), painter

V 
 Jules Verne, science fiction writer, traveller, lived in Nantes from birth to 1847 then went to Paris and shortly after returned to Nantes, where he stayed until July 1848
 Sandrine Voillet, art historian and television presenter
 Louis Vuillemin (1879–1929), composer

W 
 Pierre Waldeck-Rousseau (1846–1904), politician

References

 
Nantes
People